Perry Township is one of the fifteen townships of Ashland County, Ohio, United States. As of the 2010 census the population was 1,990.

Geography
Located in the eastern part of the county, it borders the following townships:
Jackson Township - north
Congress Township, Wayne County - northeast corner
Chester Township, Wayne County - east
Plain Township, Wayne County - southeast corner
Mohican Township - south
Vermillion Township - southwest corner
Montgomery Township - west

No municipalities are located in Perry Township.

Name and history
Perry Township was organized in 1814.

It is one of twenty-six Perry Townships statewide.

Government
The township is governed by a three-member board of trustees, who are elected in November of odd-numbered years to a four-year term beginning on the following January 1. Two are elected in the year after the presidential election and one is elected in the year before it. There is also an elected township fiscal officer, who serves a four-year term beginning on April 1 of the year after the election, which is held in November of the year before the presidential election. Vacancies in the fiscal officership or on the board of trustees are filled by the remaining trustees.

References

External links
County website

Townships in Ashland County, Ohio
1814 establishments in Ohio
Populated places established in 1814
Townships in Ohio